Antonio Mastrogiacomo (18 December 1935 – 19 November 2022) was an Italian politician. A member of the Italian Socialist Party, he served in the Chamber of Deputies from 1987 to 1992.

Mastrogiacomo died in Adelfia on 19 November 2022 at the age of 86.

References

1935 births
2022 deaths
Mayors of places in Apulia
Italian Socialist Party politicians
Deputies of Legislature X of Italy
People from the Province of Bari